KCGF may refer to:

 KCGF-LP, a low-power radio station (100.5 FM) licensed to serve San Angelo, Texas, United States
 Cuyahoga County Airport (ICAO code KCGF)